Shaft Brewer Jr. (born October 28, 1999) is an American soccer player who currently plays for USL League One side Union Omaha.

Club career

Youth
Brewer played with USL side Sacramento Republic's academy team from 2015, where he was their top goal scorer, before moving to the academy team at MLS club FC Dallas a year later, where he won the Dallas Cup Gordon Jago Super Group title. He again moved in 2017 when he joined Bundesliga club RB Leipzig in Germany, where he appeared three times for their under-19 side, scoring one goal.

Los Angeles FC
Brewer joined MLS side Los Angeles FC on March 21, 2018 during their inaugural season. Los Angeles traded a fourth-round 2019 MLS SuperDraft pick and $50,000 of General Allocation Money to FC Dallas to acquire his rights. He made his professional debut for on June 2, 2018, coming on as a 77th-minute substitute in a 2–1 loss to FC Dallas.

Fram Larvik
On August 6, 2020, he joined Norwegian Second Division side Fram Larvik.

Union Omaha
On August 18, 2022, Brewer signed with USL League One side Union Omaha.

References

External links
 

1999 births
Living people
Association football forwards
Homegrown Players (MLS)
Los Angeles FC players
Phoenix Rising FC players
Soccer players from Sacramento, California
American soccer players
United States men's under-20 international soccer players
United States men's youth international soccer players
Major League Soccer players
USL Championship players
American expatriate soccer players
Expatriate footballers in Norway
American expatriate sportspeople in Norway
Association football defenders
IF Fram Larvik players
Union Omaha players
USL League One players